Eublemma minima, the everlasting bud moth, is a moth of the family Erebidae. The species was first described by Achille Guenée in 1852. It is found in Kenya, Madagascar, South Africa and Yemen, as well as in the United States, Brazil, Argentina, Caribbean and Paraguay.

References

Boletobiinae
Moths of Madagascar
Moths of Africa
Moths described in 1852